(born January 14, 1967) is a Japanese nordic combined skier who competed during the early 1990s. He won the 3 x 10 km team event at the 1992 Winter Olympics in Albertville. Mikata also won a bronze medal in the 3 x 10 km team event at the 1991 FIS Nordic World Ski Championships in Val di Fiemme.

External links 
 
 

1967 births
Living people
Japanese male Nordic combined skiers
Olympic Nordic combined skiers of Japan
Nordic combined skiers at the 1992 Winter Olympics
Olympic medalists in Nordic combined
FIS Nordic World Ski Championships medalists in Nordic combined
Medalists at the 1992 Winter Olympics
Olympic gold medalists for Japan